Democratic National Party may refer to:

 Democratic National Party (Cyprus)
 Democratic National Party (Peru)

See also
 Democratic Nationalist Party (disambiguation)
 National Democratic Party (disambiguation)
 National Democrats (disambiguation)
 National Party (disambiguation)